The First Hill Ministry was the 53rd Ministry of the Government of South Australia, led by Lionel Hill of the Labor Party. It commenced on 28 August 1926, following the resignation of Labor Premier John Gunn. It was succeeded by the First Butler Ministry on 8 April 1927 following the Labor defeat at the 1927 state election.

References

Australian Labor Party ministries in South Australia
Hill 1